Fuxianhuiida is an extinct clade of arthropods from the Cambrian of China. All currently known species are from Cambrian Series 2 aged deposits in Yunnan Province, including the Chengjiang biota. They are generally considered to be close to the base of Euarthropoda, but have also been considered to be early mandibulates. Many specimens are known with exceptional soft tissue preservation, including preserved guts and neural tissue, which given their basal phylogenetic position makes them important in understanding the evolution of arthropoda as a whole. They reach a size of up to 15 cm, and are interpreted as benthic predators and scavengers. The fuxianhuiid exoskeleton is unmineralised, and the number of tergites ranges from 15 to over 40. The cephalon is covered by a head shield and contains stalked eyes connected by the anterior sclerite, antennae, a butterfly shaped hyposome and a posterior facing mouth. Fuxianhuiids possess specialized post-antennal appendages with serrated edges used for food processing. The presence of gnathobases in members of Chengjiangocardidae suggests that they were capable of durophagy. In most fuxianhuiids, the thorax tergites narrow posteriorly, terminating in either a swimming paddle or paired flukes with a tailspine. In members of Fuxianhuiidae the thorax is divided into two sections, the anterior wide opisthothorax and the posterior narrow limbless tail-like abdomen.

Taxonomy 
Per

It has been suggested that Shankouia zhenghei is synonymous with Liangwangshania biloba, with sexual dimorphism accounting for variation between specimens.

References 

Arthropods
Prehistoric arthropod orders